Reisangmei Vashum (born 10 January 1988 in Manipur) is an Indian footballer who plays as a midfielder for TRAU in I-League 2nd Division.

Career

Early career
Vashum first played for Hindustan Aeronautics Limited of Bangalore in his youth career before signing for Churchill Brothers of the I-League in 2008. Vashum scored his first goal for Churchill Brothers in the I-League on 15 November 2008 against Mumbai F.C. in the 70th minute in a match that Churchill drew 2–2. He then scored his second goal for Churchill Brothers on 20 February 2009 against Vasco S.C. in the 77th minute in a match that Churchill Brothers won 9–1. Vashum then scored again for Churchill Brothers on 6 October 2009 against Viva Kerala in which he scored in the 5th minute for the club as Churchill Brothers won 2–0. Vashum then continued his scoring run in the next round against Mumbai F.C. on 16 October 2009 in which he scored in the 20th minute in a match that Churchill drew 1–1. Vashum then went on to score the equalizer for Churchill Brothers in the next match against JCT Mills on 23 October 2009 in which he scored in the 84th minute to help Churchill salvage a 1–1 draw. Vashum did not score again for Churchill Brothers till 22 January 2010 in which he scored in the 14th minute for Churchill Brothers against East Bengal F.C. at the Salt Lake Stadium in a match that Churchill Brothers lost 3–2.

East Bengal
Vashum signed for East Bengal F.C. in 2010 and he scored his first goal for East Bengal on 26 February 2011 against Indian Arrows in which he scored in the 19th minute in a match that East Bengal drew 1–1.

Mumbai
In December 2014, Vashum signed for Mumbai F.C.

Honours
Churchill Brothers
IFA Shield: 2009

References

1988 births
Living people
Indian footballers
India international footballers
Churchill Brothers FC Goa players
I-League players
Footballers from Manipur
East Bengal Club players
Association football midfielders
Tollygunge Agragami FC players
Mumbai FC players
Mohammedan SC (Kolkata) players
TRAU FC players